A place of refuge includes various places where people can seek refuge:

 An asylum (antiquity), in antiquity, a place (usually a temple) where people could seek refuge
 A sovereign offering the right of asylum
 A sanctuary, a place offering safety from persecution
 Place of refuge for ships, for ships in distress